Cleave is a surname. Notable people with the surname include:

Chris Cleave (born 1973), British journalist
Egbert Cleave (fl. 1870s), American author
John Cleave (born c. 1790), British chartist
Mary L. Cleave (born 1947), American astronaut and engineer
Maureen Cleave (1934-2021), British journalist
Paul Cleave (born 1974), New Zealand author
Thomas L. Cleave (1906-1983), British surgeon captain